Isocomene is a sesquiterpene first isolated from the perennial herb southern goldenbush (Isocoma wrightii), from which it derives its name. Its unusual structure consisting of three fused cyclopentane rings was first described by Zalkow et al. in 1977. The first total synthesis of isocomene was published by M.C. Pirrung in 1979. The key steps are a photocatalyzed intramolecular [2 + 2] cycloaddition reaction followed by a rearrangement reaction which forms three contiguous chiral centers.

References

Sesquiterpenes
Cyclopentanes
Cyclopentenes
Tricyclic compounds